Defending champions Esther Vergeer and Sharon Walraven defeated Jiske Griffioen and Aniek van Koot in the final, 6–4, 3–6, 7–5 to win the ladies' doubles wheelchair tennis title at the 2011 Wimbledon Championships. It was their third step towards an eventual Grand Slam, and Vergeer completed the triple career Grand Slam with the win.

Seeds

  Esther Vergeer /  Sharon Walraven (champions)
  Jiske Griffioen /  Aniek van Koot (final)

Draw

Finals

External links
Draw

Women's Wheelchair Doubles
Wimbledon Championship by year – Wheelchair women's doubles